Thomas Harold "Tug" Wilson (23 November 1917 – 1959) was an English professional footballer. He played for Gillingham between 1936 and 1949.

References

1917 births
1959 deaths
English footballers
Gillingham F.C. players
Footballers from Lewisham
Association football forwards